The 2009 Big East football season was an NCAA football season that was played from September 5, 2009, to January 2, 2010.  The Big East Conference consists of 8 football members:  Cincinnati, Connecticut, Louisville, Pittsburgh, Rutgers, South Florida, Syracuse, and West Virginia. Cincinnati won the Big East Championship for the second consecutive year and was invited to the Allstate Sugar Bowl where they lost to Florida 51–24. Overall, the Big East went 4–2 in Bowl Games.

Previous season
Cincinnati (11-3) was the Big East champions and got the conference's automatic bid into the BCS and went to the FedEx Orange Bowl, losing to ACC champion Virginia Tech 20-7.
 
Five other Big East teams went to bowl games in 2008, finishing bowl play with a record of 4-2 as a conference. Connecticut (8-5) beat Buffalo 38-20 in the International Bowl. Pittsburgh (9-4) lost to Oregon State 3-0 in the Brut Sun Bowl. Rutgers (8-5) beat North Carolina State 29-23 in the PapaJohns.com Bowl. South Florida (8-5) beat Memphis 41-14 in the magicJack St. Petersburg Bowl. And West Virginia (9-4) beat North Carolina 31-30 in the Meineke Car Care Bowl. The only two teams not to go to a bowl game were Louisville (5-7) and Syracuse (3-9).

Preseason

Preseason poll
The 2009 Big East preseason poll was announced at the Big East Media Day in Newport, RI on August 4. Pittsburgh was chosen as the favorite to win the conference.

Big East Media Poll
Pittsburgh – 161 (8)
West Virginia – 151 (5)
Cincinnati – 144 (8)
South Florida – 130 (3)
Rutgers – 126
Connecticut – 74
Louisville – 51 
Syracuse – 27

Award watch lists

Regular season

All times Eastern time.

Rankings reflect that of the USA Today Coaches poll for that week until week eight when the BCS rankings will be used.

Week One

Players of the week:

Week Two

Players of the week:

Week Three

Players of the week:

Week Four

Players of the week:

Week Five

Players of the week:

Week Six

Players of the week:

Week Seven

On October 18, UConn cornerback Jasper Howard was stabbed to death during a fight at an on campus dance. Howard had a career-high 11 tackles and forced a 3rd-quarter fumble to earn the game ball just hours before his death.

Players of the week:

Week Eight

Players of the week:

Week Nine

Players of the week:

Week Ten

Players of the week:

Week Eleven

Players of the week:

Week Twelve

Players of the week:

Week Thirteen

Players of the week:

Week Fourteen

Players of the week:

Rankings

Records against other conferences
As of games through week 13

Bowl games

Attendance

Awards and honors

Big East Conference Awards

The following individuals received postseason honors as voted by the Big East Conference football coaches.

References